Leonard Dobbin (29 September 1762 – 19 February 1844) was an Irish Liberal politician who sat in the House of Commons from 1832 to 1837.

He was the eldest son of Leonard Dobbin senior, of Mount Dobbin, Tirnascobe, County Armagh and Mary Oates, daughter of Thomas Oates, and a descendant of Adam Murray, who commanded the Williamite forces at the Siege of Derry. The Dobbins were an old Carrickfergus family, one branch of which settled in Armagh.

Dobbin was a clerk of the peace in Armagh. In the 1832 general election Dobbin was elected as Member of Parliament (MP) for Armagh City. He held the seat until 1837. Dobbin then became High Sheriff of Armagh in 1838.

Dobbin gave to the city an area of parkland beside the Ballinahone River in Armagh. This is commemorated in the song Dobbin's Flowery Vale.

He had no children, and his estates passed to his nephew and namesake Leonard Dobbin. On his retirement from politics, his seat in the House of Commons was successfully contested by another nephew, William Curry (1784-1843), Serjeant-at-law (Ireland), son of his sister Anne, who married William Curry senior of Aughnacloy, County Tyrone.

References

External links
 

1775 births
1844 deaths
UK MPs 1832–1835
UK MPs 1835–1837
High Sheriffs of Armagh
Members of the Parliament of the United Kingdom for County Armagh constituencies (1801–1922)